Ernest E. Gooden (February 4, 1900 – October 19, 1934), nicknamed "Pud", was an American Negro league infielder in the 1920s.

A native of Pittsburgh, Pennsylvania, Gooden made his Negro leagues debut in 1921 with the Homestead Grays and Pittsburgh Keystones. He rejoined Pittsburgh again the following season. Gooden made the Chicago American Giants roster in early 1923 before splitting time with the Toledo Tigers, Cleveland Tate Stars, and Detroit Stars the rest of the season. He died in Pittsburgh in 1934 at age 34.

References

External links
 and Baseball-Reference Black Baseball stats and Seamheads

1900 births
1934 deaths
Cleveland Tate Stars players
Detroit Stars players
Homestead Grays players
Pittsburgh Keystones players
Toledo Tigers players
20th-century African-American sportspeople
Baseball infielders

 Ernest Gooden at SABR (Baseball BioProject)